Amy Standen is an American journalist and author. She cofounded the quarterly magazine Meatpaper in 2006 with former Salon.com journalist Sasha Wizansky. She reports for KQED, and has also reported for NPR and The Environment Report.

Personal
Standen was born and raised in San Francisco, California. She also has two kids.

Career
Standen began her career in journalism working in New York City for KPFA. Since her time there, she has been a producer on Pulse of the Planet, editor of Terrain Magazine, editor at Salon, and reporter for KALW's Philosophy Talk. While working as a radio reporter for KQED, Standen has been responsible for covering science and environmental issues facing Northern California.

Honors and awards
James Madison Freedom of Information Award
Standen's work has also been recognized by the National Association of Public Radio News Directors and Northern California's Society of Professional Journalists

Works

Standen is the author of Maggie Taylor's Landscape of Dreams, a book about the digital artwork of Maggie Taylor (published in 2005). She interviewed chef Chris Cosentino for issue zero of Meatpaper.

References 

American food writers
American art historians
Women art historians
Living people
American women journalists
Salon (website) people
American women historians
Women food writers
Year of birth missing (living people)
21st-century American women